Kallipennu is a 1966 Indian Malayalam-language film, directed and produced by P. A. Thomas. The film stars Sathyan, Adoor Bhasi, Thikkurissy Sukumaran Nair and Muthukulam Raghavan Pillai. The film had musical score by B. A. Chidambaranath.

Cast

Sathyan
Adoor Bhasi
Thikkurissy Sukumaran Nair
Muthukulam Raghavan Pillai
T. R. Omana
Jolly
Parvathi
Premakumari
K. V. Shanthi
Ushakumari
Adithyan

Soundtrack
The music was composed by B. A. Chidambaranath and the lyrics were written by P. Bhaskaran.

References

External links
 

1966 films
1960s Malayalam-language films